Pfeiffer may refer to:

 Pfeiffer (surname)
 Pfeiffer effect, an optical phenomenon

In health
 Pfeiffer syndrome, a rare genetic disorder characterized by the premature fusion of certain bones of the skull
 Infectious mononucleosis, also known as the kissing disease, or Pfeiffer's disease

Places
 Pfeiffer, Arkansas, U.S.
 Pfeiffer, Ohio, U.S.
 Pfeiffer Lake, Minnesota, U.S.
 Pfeiffer Big Sur State Park
 Julia Pfeiffer Burns State Park

Organizations
 Pfeiffer University, Misenheimer, North Carolina, U.S.
 Carl A. Pfeiffer, a German piano manufacturer
 Pfeiffer Vacuum, a German manufacturer of vacuum pumps

See also 
 Pfeiffer House (disambiguation)
 Pfeifer, a surname
 Pfeffer, a surname